Got Talent Portugal (season 1) was the first season of the talent show Got Talent Portugal. This was a Portuguese version of the British show Britain's Got Talent. The competition was won by The ArtGym Company.

Semi-final rounds

Semi-Final 1

Semi-Final 2 

Portugal
2010s Portuguese television series
2015 Portuguese television seasons